Methylisopropyllysergamide (lysergic acid methylisopropyl amide, MIPLA) is an analogue of LSD that was originally discovered by Albert Hofmann at Sandoz during the original structure-activity research into LSD. It has subsequently been investigated in more detail by the team led by David E. Nichols at Purdue University. Methylisopropyllysergamide is a structural isomer of LSD, with the alkyl groups on the amide nitrogen having been subjected to a methylene shuffle. MIPLA and its ethylisopropyl homologue are the only simple N,N-dialkyl lysergamides that approach the potency of LSD itself, being around 1/3-1/2 the potency of LSD, while all other dialkyl analogues tested (dimethyl, dipropyl, methylethyl etc.) are only around 1/10 as potent as LSD, although some N-monoalkyl lysergamides such as the sec-butyl and t-butyl derivatives were also found to show an activity profile and potency comparable to LSD, and the mono-isopropyl derivative is only slightly weaker than MIPLA. Apart from its lower potency, the hallucinogenic effects of methylisopropyllysergamide are similar to those of LSD itself, and the main use for this drug has been in studies of the binding site at the 5-HT2A receptor through which LSD exerts most of its pharmacological effects.

See also
 Lysergic acid 2-butyl amide
 Lysergic acid 3-pentyl amide

References

Psychedelic drugs
Lysergamides